Eric Paul Shaffer is an American novelist and poet, who lives and works in Hawai‘i. Currently a professor of English at Honolulu Community College, he formerly taught at Maui Community College and the University of the Ryukyus on Okinawa. His work has appeared in more than 550 national and international reviews, journals, and magazines, including Bamboo Ridge, the Chaminade Literary Review, the Chicago Review, the Chiron Review, Slate, The Sun Magazine, and the North American Review, as well as in the anthologies 100 Poets Against the War, The EcoPoetry Anthology, Jack London Is Dead: Contemporary Euro-American Poetry of Hawai‘i (And Some Stories), Crossing Lines, In the Trenches, Weatherings, and The Soul Unearthed. He is the author of seven collections of poetry and one novel.

Shaffer is a graduate of the University of California, Davis, where he received a Ph.D. in American Literature in 1991. He received the Elliot Cades Award for Literature, Hawaii's highest literary honor, in 2002, and the James Vaughan Award for Poetry in 2010. He was a visiting poetry faculty member at the 23rd annual Jackson Hole Writers Conference. His poetry collection Lāhaina Noon received an Award for Excellence in the 2006 Ka Palapala Po'okela Book Awards. His poetry collection Even Further West received an Honorable Mention in the 2019 Ka Palapala Po'okela Book Awards.

Bibliography
Kindling: Poems from Two Poets (1988) (with James Taylor III)
RattleSnake Rider (1990)
Portable Planet: Poems (2000)
How I Read Gertrude Stein by Lew Welch (editor and introduction) (1995)
Living at the Monastery, Working in the Kitchen (2001)
Lāhaina Noon: Nā Mele O Maui (2005)
Burn & Learn: Memoirs of the Cenozoic Era (2009)
A Million-Dollar Bill (2016)
Even Further West (2018)

References

External links
Works by Eric Paul Shaffer at WorldCat

21st-century American novelists
20th-century American novelists
American male novelists
Living people
Novelists from Hawaii
University of California, Davis alumni
University of Hawaiʻi faculty
21st-century American poets
20th-century American poets
American male poets
20th-century American male writers
21st-century American male writers
Year of birth missing (living people)
Academic staff of the University of the Ryukyus